Punjabi paranda is also known as , is a women's hair ornament made of multicolored silk threads and decorated with floral (bunches) designs and ornamental tassels. The  is a part of ethnic Punjabi clothing. Pranda is a folk accessory of Punjabi culture. Patiala is famous for its salwars and Parandas

Material 
Paranda is made by interweaving the silk threads of different contrast colors. Women in Punjab were making parandas by themselves as a hobby and art and craft.

Style 
Women braid their long hairs with Paranda matching to their costume, it suits well with ethnic Punjabi clothing. They wear it during the folk dances for instance Giddha. Young girls and women embrace it on special occasions like marriages and folk festivals such as Lohri, Vaisakhi, Teej, Karva Chauth, etc. Pranda is losing its style with time, and the appearance is drawing to fewer occasions.

See also 
Jutti
Phulkari

Gallery

References 

Hairdressing
Punjabi clothing
Folk costumes
Decorative ropework
Punjabi words and phrases